Tomorrow is a New Day (Spanish title: Y mañana será otro día; stylized onscreen as Y mañana será otro día... mejor) is a Mexican telenovela produced by Carlos Moreno premiered on Las Estrellas on 16 April 2018. It is an adaptation of the 2009 Chilean telenovela Cuenta conmigo created by José Ignacio Valenzuela. The production started on February 26, 2018 at Forum 11 of Televisa San Ángel. It stars Angélica Vale as the main character.

Plot 
The series revolves around Mónica Rojas (Angélica Vale), a secretary dedicated entirely to her work in Media Link, the company founded and led by Camilo Sarmiento (Diego Olivera). Monica is not only responsible for the professional agenda of her boss, but also of his personal life, which includes his wife Diana (Alejandra Barros) and their children. Since Mónica meets Camilo, she falls deeply in love, even knowing that her love has no hope. But her love expectations will change, when Diana proposes to her to fall in love with Camilo when she dies due to a serious illness.

Cast 
 Angélica Vale as Mónica Rojas
 Diego Olivera as Camilo Sarmiento
 Alejandra Barros as Diana Alcántara Lazcano de Sarmiento 
 Nuria Bages as Eugenia
 Ana Layevska as Margarita Rojas de González
 Fabián Robles as Adrián
 Diego de Erice as Manuel González
 Fernanda Borches as Laura
 Emmanuel Palomares as Rafael de la Maza
 Florencia del Saracho as Ximena Izaguirre
 Mauricio Abularach as Mauricio
 Socorro Bonilla as Chabela
 Estefanía Villarreal as Nora Solé
 Andrea Escalona as Lidia
 Miranda Kay as Regina Sarmiento
 Lizy Martínez as Bárbara "Barbie" Sarmiento
 Oliver Nava as Cristóbal
 Ari Placera as Nicólas "Nico" Sarmiento
 Chris Pascal as Pablo
 Luis José Sevilla as Luis
 Sergio Saldívar as Dr. Juan
 Miguel Díaz-Morlet as Armando
 Alejandro Cervantes as Ferchi
 Sergio Madrigal as Damián
 Rocío Padilla as Paloma
 Monserrat Jiménez as Cristina Rivapalacios
 Janeth Ponzo as Pilar Embil
 Luis Hacha as Iñaki de la Maza
 Ana La Salvia as Almudena Cervantes
 Macaria as Mercedes Garza
 Leo Deluglio as El Killer

Rating

References 

Mexican telenovelas
Televisa telenovelas
2018 telenovelas
2018 Mexican television series debuts
2018 Mexican television series endings
Mexican television series based on Chilean television series
Spanish-language telenovelas